Brothers is an album by the American contemporary gospel group Take 6, issued in 1996 on Reprise Records. The album rose to No. 18 on the Billboard Top Christian Albums chart.

Critical reception
Brothers won a Grammy for Best Contemporary R&B Gospel Album.

Track listing
"Sing a Song" (Maurice White, Al McKay)
"You Don't Have to Be Afraid" (David Thomas, Les Pierce)
"I'll Be There" (Brian McKnight, Claude V. McKnight III)
"Delilah" (Brian McKnight, C. McKnight, Mark Kibble)
"Chance of a Lifetime" (James Patrick Dunne, Kibble)
"Can't Stop Thinking 'Bout You" (Thomas, Pierce, Alvin Chea)
"Jesus Makes Me Happy" (Hallerin Hilton Hill)
"We Don't Have to Cry" (Brian McKnight, Brandon Barnes)
"Do Right" (Paul Davis)
"Don't Let Go" (Brian McKnight)

References

Take 6 albums
1996 albums
Reprise Records albums